Banana is a name or alias of the following notable people

Given name 
 Banana (video gamer), alias of the Chinese professional Dota player Wang Jiao
 Banana Joe, alias of the American radio personality Joe Montione (born 1954)
 Banana Yaya (born 1991), Cameroonian footballer
 Banana Yoshimoto, pen name of the Japanese writer Mahoko Yoshimoto (born 1964)
 Lowell Levinger, member of The Youngbloods.

Surname
 Anna Banana, alias of the Canadian artist Anne Lee Long (born 1940)
 Canaan Banana (1936–2003), Methodist minister and first president of Zimbabwe
 Janet Banana (1938–2021), Zimbabwean socialite and wife of Canaan Banana
 Milton Banana, stage name of the Brazilian jazz drummer Antônio de Souza (1935–1998)